Acacia lucasii, commonly known as the woolly-bear wattle or Lucas's wattle, is a species of wattle native to the southeastern corner of Australia.

References

lucasii
Flora of New South Wales